is a 2005 Japanese black comedy drama film written and directed by Sion Sono. It screened at the 2009 Hong Kong Asian Film Festival. The title comes from the 1973 single by Yosui Inoue.

Plot
The movie focuses on the misadventures of low-profile theater troupe actor Mutsugoro Suzuki who begins a surreal journey back to his hometown, marked by his quest to find the person responsible for infecting him with a sexually transmitted disease. As he travels down to his parents' house for a family reunion, his dreams become more and more intrusive. Eventually, after reuniting with his father, younger sister and friends, his dreams eat away at his sanity and he finds himself unable to differentiate between his dreams and reality. Thus, the movie ends with Suzuki abruptly leaving his family reunion and running down the evening road screaming and singing "Into a Dream."

External links
 
 Film details at MYAC

2000s Japanese-language films
2005 films
2005 black comedy films
2005 drama films
Films directed by Sion Sono
Films about sexually transmitted diseases
Japanese black comedy films
Japanese drama films
2000s Japanese films